Ballykissangel is a BBC television drama created by Kieran Prendiville and set in Ireland, produced in-house by BBC Northern Ireland. The original story revolved around a young English Roman Catholic priest as he became part of a rural community. It ran for six series, which were first broadcast on BBC One in the United Kingdom from 1996 to 2001. It aired in Ireland on RTÉ One and in Australia on ABC TV from 1996 to 2001. Repeats have been shown on Drama in the United Kingdom and in the United States on some PBS affiliates.

Significant changes in the cast occurred at the end of series 3 following the departure of central characters Peter Clifford and Assumpta Fitzgerald.

The show faced a decline in ratings from a peak level of 10 million viewers to 4.8 million and was eventually cancelled in 2001.

The name of the fictional village in which the show was set is derived from Ballykissane, a townland near Killorglin in County Kerry, where the show's creator, Kieran Prendiville, holidayed with his family as a child. The village's name in Irish is shown as "Baile Coisc Aingeal", which means "The town of the fallen angel", on the sign outside the post office.

The show was filmed in Avoca and Enniskerry in County Wicklow.

Cast

Episodes
The programme ran for six series from 11 February 1996 to 15 April 2001. Almost all episodes were 50 minutes in duration.

All six series have been released in Region 1, 2, and 4. In 2010, four years after the release of series 5, series 6 was released on Region 2, along with a box set of series 1–6.

The ninth episode of series 3, "The Waiting Game", was omitted from early Region 2 series 3 DVDs and all the Region 4 (Australian) DVD releases.
This is not the case with the 2010 box set or any Region 1 (North America) sets, all of which contain this episode.

Repeats of the show were formerly aired every weekday on Virgin Media Three in the Republic of Ireland. In the Netherlands and Flanders, ONS started broadcasting Ballykissangel in 2020.

Series overview

Series 1 (1996)

Series 2 (1997)

Series 3 (1997-98)

Series 4 (1998)

Series 5 (1999)

Series 6 (2001)

In other media

Father Peter Clifford and Assumpta Fitzgerald make a guest appearance in the 1996 Father Ted Christmas special "A Christmassy Ted", where they appear in a dream Father Ted Crilly has.

In 1997, both Father Clifford and Assumpta Fitzgerald made guest appearances in a Comic Relief edition of The Vicar of Dibley entitled "Ballykissdibley", where the lead characters from both shows participated.

References

External links
 Ballykissangel at the British Film Institute
 
 

1996 British television series debuts
2001 British television series endings
1990s British drama television series
2000s British drama television series
BBC Northern Ireland television shows
BBC television dramas
Television shows set in the Republic of Ireland
2000s television series from Northern Ireland
1990s television series from Northern Ireland